The John Sprunt Hill House is a historic house at 900 S. Duke street in Durham, North Carolina, in the Morehead Hill Historic District. Built in 1911–1912, it was the home of John Sprunt Hill (1869–1961) and his wife Annie Watts Hill (died 1940), daughter of George Washington Watts, co-founder of the American Tobacco Company. It was listed on the National Register of Historic Places in 1978.

Hill bequeathed the Spanish Colonial Revival mansion to a foundation created in memory of his wife. The Annie Watts Hill Foundation was created to support non-sectarian, non-political female organizations. As of 2008, the Junior League of Durham and Orange Counties makes its home here, although it is open to any group meeting the aforementioned criteria.

References 

Houses on the National Register of Historic Places in North Carolina
Mission Revival architecture in North Carolina
Houses completed in 1912
Houses in Durham, North Carolina
National Register of Historic Places in Durham County, North Carolina
1912 establishments in North Carolina
Historic district contributing properties in North Carolina
Junior League